Dyoenergism (derived from Greek as term for "two energies") is a particular Christological doctrine that teaches the existence of two energies (divine and human) in the person of Jesus Christ. Specifically, dyoenergism correlates the distinctiveness of two energies with the existence of two specific natures (divine and human) in the person of Jesus Christ (dyophysitism), and rejects monoenergism. Therefore, dyoenergism teaches that Jesus Christ acts through two energies, divine and human. The Sixth Ecumenical Council in 680-681 reaffirmed dyoenergism as church doctrine.

See also
 Essence–energies distinction (Eastern Orthodox theology)
 Monoenergism

References

Sources

External links 
 Classical Christianity (2016): St. Cyril on Dyoenergism and Dyotheletism

Christology
Christian terminology
Eastern Orthodox theology
Christianity in the Byzantine Empire
7th-century Christianity
Nature of Jesus Christ